Marojejy leaf chameleon may refer to:
 Brookesia griveaudi
 Brookesia betschi

Animal common name disambiguation pages